Tetiana Barantsova (born 1973 or 1974) is a Ukrainian disability rights activist and the founder of Ami-Skhid organisation. She was the 2020 European winner of the Nansen Refugee Award.

Early life and education 
Barantsova was born in 1973 or 1974 in Luhansk. She broke her spine at the age of ten years while doing school gymnastics.

Adult life 
Barantsova is a disability rights activist and in 2002 she set up Ami-Skhid non-governmental organisation that helps Ukrainian women, families, and youth with disabilities. The organisation undertakes advocacy and provides counselling and support services to people with disabilities.

In 2014, Barantsova, her husband, and her son were displaced by the Russo-Ukrainian War. Once she reached safety, she set up a phone line to provide advice to people with disabilities who were trapped in the conflict zone, and provided advice, cash, and both legal and psychological support to 5,000 people. Barantsova also set up an online school for internally displaced children, providing education to 1,000 pupils.

in 2020, she was the European winner of the Nansen Refugee Award.

As of 2022, she was an advisor to the government of Ukraine.

Personal life 
Barantsova was aged 46 in September 2020.

References 

1970s births
Women founders
Disability rights activists
Ukrainian women activists
Living people